Dakomin is an unincorporated community in Windsor Township, Traverse County, Minnesota, United States.

Notes

Unincorporated communities in Traverse County, Minnesota
Unincorporated communities in Minnesota